Wang Shenchao (born 8 February 1989) is a Chinese footballer who currently plays for Shanghai SIPG in the Chinese Super League.

Club career
Wang Shenchao started his football career when he joined the Genbao Football Academy in 2000 and was promoted to Shanghai SIPG's first team for the 2006 season. He became a regular for the club as Shanghai won promotion to the second tier in the 2007 season. He became the club's captain after Wang Jiayu transferred to Nanchang Hengyuan in January 2011. Wang was linked with a move to Shanghai Shenxin after the 2011 season but decided to stay at the club. He appeared in 29 league matches and scored three goals in the 2012 season as Shanghai clinched the second tier league title and was subsequently promoted to the top flight.

International career
Wang made his debut for the Chinese national team on 7 June 2017 in an 8-1 win against the Philippines. On 26 May 2018, he was caught on camera taking out a necklace from his sock and wearing it during an international friendly against Myanmar. On 12 June 2018, he received a one-year ban from the national team.

Career statistics

Club statistics

International statistics

Honours

Club
Shanghai SIPG
Chinese Super League: 2018
China League One: 2012
China League Two: 2007
Chinese FA Super Cup: 2019

Individual
Chinese Super League Team of the Year: 2017

References

External links
 
 

1989 births
Living people
Chinese footballers
Footballers from Shanghai
Shanghai Port F.C. players
Chinese Super League players
China League One players
China League Two players
Association football defenders
China international footballers